Maliek Collins Sr.  (born April 8, 1995) is an American football defensive tackle for the Houston Texans of the National Football League (NFL). He played college football at Nebraska.

Early years 
Collins was born on April 8, 1995, in Kansas City, Kansas, to Janice Davis and C.W. Collins, a mechanic. He has two older sisters. His father C.W. died of a heart attack when Collins was 6 years old.

Collins attended Center High School in Kansas City, Missouri, where he was an outstanding athlete in both American football and wrestling. As a junior, he had a 48-5 record in wrestling and advanced to the state quarterfinals. As a senior, he compiled a perfect 48-0 record in wrestling and won the state championship. As a senior defensive tackle he posted 102 tackles (43 for loss), 15 sacks and 5 forced fumbles.

He accepted a scholarship from the University of Nebraska to play college football.

College career 
As a freshman, he played in 12 games as a backup defensive lineman. The next year, he was named a starter at defensive tackle, leading the team in tackles for loss with 14, while finishing second on the team with 4.5 sacks and 13 quarterback pressures. He also had 45 tackles (17 solo).

In his junior season, he started 12 games at nose tackle, where he faced more double teams, registering 29 tackles (7 for loss), 2.5 sacks and 6 quarterback pressures.

After his junior season, Collins decided to forgo his senior year and enter the 2016 NFL Draft. He finished his college career with 8 sacks, 19 quarterback pressures and 23 tackles for loss.

College statistics

Professional career 
Coming out of college, Collins was projected by some analysts to be a second or third round selection.

Dallas Cowboys 
Collins was selected by the Dallas Cowboys in the third round (67th overall) of the 2016 NFL draft.

On July 13, 2016, the Cowboys signed Collins to a four-year, $3.22 million contract with $887,545 guaranteed and a signing bonus of $881,152. He was the last remaining Cowboys player of the 2016 draft class to be signed. He suffered a broken right foot during the first week of organized team activities, he was placed on the physically unable to perform list and missed most of the preseason.

Collins began his rookie season as the fourth defensive tackle on the depth chart behind the veterans Tyrone Crawford, Terrell McClain and Cedric Thornton. Although he made his professional regular season debut in the Cowboys’ season-opening loss to the New York Giants, he did not record a statistic.

The improved play he showed in the second game of the season against the Washington Redskins made the Cowboys decide in the fourth quarter to move Crawford to left defensive end and keep Collins as the full-time one-technique tackle, where he was playing out of position. He finished the game with three combined tackles and multiple quarterback hurries. The following week, Collins earned his first career start at defensive tackle and made two combined tackles in the Cowboys' 31-17 defeat over the Chicago Bears.

On November 9, 2016, Collins made his first career sack on Cleveland Browns quarterback Cody Kessler. He finished the 35-10 victory with three solo tackles and two sacks. He started at the three-technique tackle position against the Bears, 49ers, Bengals and Packers.

During a Week 13 win over the Minnesota Vikings, Collins made two combined tackle and sacked Sam Bradford for his third of the season. On December 18, 2016, Collins made one solo tackle, and sacked Tampa Bay Buccaneers quarterback Jameis Winston causing a forced fumble, the first of his career, helping the Dallas Cowboys win 26–20. He finished second on the team with 5 sacks.

On September 17, 2017, in Week 2 against the Denver Broncos, Collins's teammate DeMarcus Lawrence forced a fumble off of quarterback Trevor Siemian. The fumble was recovered by Collins and helped set up the Cowboys on a touchdown-scoring drive in the 42–17 loss.

On May 14, 2018, Collins underwent foot surgery to repair the fifth metatarsal fracture and was ruled out until at least August.

Las Vegas Raiders 
On March 30, 2020, Collins signed a one-year contract with the Las Vegas Raiders. He was placed on the reserve/COVID-19 list by the team on November 18, and activated three days later. He played in 10 games before being placed on injured reserve on December 4, 2020. On December 26, 2020, Collins was activated off of injured reserve.

Houston Texans 
On March 23, 2021, Collins signed a one-year contract with the Houston Texans. He started 15 games in 2021, recording a career-high 29 tackles, along with 2.5 sacks and an interception.

On March 18, 2022, Collins signed a two-year contract extension with the Texans.

References

External links 
 Dallas Cowboys bio
 Nebraska Cornhuskers bio
 ESPN NFL profile

1995 births
Living people
Players of American football from Kansas City, Missouri
American football defensive tackles
Nebraska Cornhuskers football players
Dallas Cowboys players
Las Vegas Raiders players
Houston Texans players